Khakak Arab (also Romanized as Khākak ‘Arab; also known as‘Arab Khākak and Khākak-e ‘Arabhā) is a village in Rostam-e Seh Rural District, Sorna District, Rostam County, Fars Province, Iran. At the 2006 census, its population was 1,474, in 232 families.

References 

Populated places in Rostam County